WAYY (790 kHz) is a commercial AM radio station in Eau Claire, Wisconsin.  It broadcasts a sports radio format and is owned by Mid-West Family Broadcasting.  Programming is mostly from CBS Sports Radio.  It also carries Milwaukee Brewers baseball and Milwaukee Bucks basketball.  The radio studios and offices are in Altoona, Wisconsin.

By day, WAYY transmits with 5,000 watts non-directional.  But to protect other stations on 790 AM from interference, it reduces power at night to 123 watts.  (For most of its history, WAYY ran 5,000 watts around the clock, using a directional antenna at night with multiple towers.  But as an economy move, those extra towers were sold off and nighttime power was reduced.)  WAYY's transmitter is on Black Avenue at Tower Drive in Seymour, Wisconsin.  Programming is also heard on 185-watt FM translator W286CK at 105.1 MHz in Eau Claire.

History
In 1954, the station first signed on as WCHF, changing its call letters to WAXX in 1958.  In its early years, it was on 1150 kHz.  The station played current middle of the road music (MOR), then converted to country music in 1966.  In the 1960s, WAXX was bought by the same company that owned WEAU-TV/WEAU-FM, and the country format was simulcast on WEAU-FM, renamed WAXX-FM in 1977.  In February, 1978, WAXX was rebranded as WAYY  and began playing an oldies format.  After several format modifications, WAYY went to talk radio in January 1991.

WAYY & WAXX were sold to Central Communications in 1984, and moved into their new building (and current home) behind WEAU-TV in 1985.  Following the acquisition of WEAQ 790 in 1996, the two AM stations switched frequencies, with WAYY now at 790 on the AM dial.  WAYY, WAXX, WEAQ and sister stations WIAL, WECL & WDRK were sold to Maverick Media, LLC in 2003.

WAYY and its Eau Claire sister stations, along with Maverick Media's Rockford, Illinois stations, were sold to Mid-West Family Broadcasting for $15.5 million. The purchase of the Eau Claire stations was consummated on October 1, 2013, while the Rockford station purchases were consummated on June 1, 2014.

On April 28, 2014, WAYY changed its format to sports, with programming from CBS Sports Radio.

On July 27, 2016, WAYY began simulcasting on FM translator W286CK 105.1 FM Eau Claire.

Previous logos
  (WAYY's logo from 2003 to 2014 under previous news/talk format)

  (WAYY's logo from 2016 to 2017 under previous branding)

References

External links

AYY
Sports radio stations in the United States
Radio stations established in 1953